Khushab Nuclear Complex is a plutonium production nuclear reactor and heavy water complex situated 30 km south of the town of Jauharabad in Khushab District, Punjab, Pakistan.

The heavy water and natural uranium reactors at Khushab are a central element of Pakistan's program to produce plutonium and tritium for use in compact nuclear warheads. Khushab Nuclear Complex, like that at Kahuta, is not subject to International Atomic Energy Agency inspections.

Four currently operating reactors have capacities variously reported at between 40 MWth to 50 MWth, and as high as 70 MWth. In total, they are estimated to be capable of producing 44 kg of weapons grade plutonium annually. Plutonium production and nuclear reprocessing facilities are being expanded at Khushab, New Labs and Chashma.

Pakistan's first indigenous nuclear reactor was commissioned at Khushab in March 1996. The Khushab Nuclear Complex was conceived and planned by the then chairman of the Pakistan Atomic Energy Commission (PAEC), Munir Ahmad Khan, who began work on the 50 MWth Khushab-I reactor and heavy water plant in 1986. He appointed nuclear engineer Sultan Bashiruddin Mahmood and Dr. N.A. Javed, both from the PAEC, as the Project-Directors for the reactor and the heavy water plant respectively. According to a Pakistani press report this reactor began operating in early 1998.

Based on the success of these projects and the experience and capability gained during their construction, onsite construction work on the second unit began around 2001 or 2002. In February 2010 Prime Minister Yousaf Raza Gillani and senior military officers attended a ceremony at the Khushab complex for what is believed to be the completion of the second reactor. There has been little to no government comment on the complex or other aspects of the nuclear weapons program since the late 1990s.

Judging by external appearance all but the first reactor are similar or identical in design.

Reactors

Khushab-I was commissioned in March 1996 and had gone critical and begun production by early 1998.
Construction of Khushab-II started in 2001. It was complete by 2010.
The construction of Khushab-III started in 2006 and was complete by 2013. Similar to the other three completed reactors, Khushab-III is a 50 MWth heavy water reactor producing 11-15 kilograms of plutonium a year for Pakistan's nuclear weapons programme.
Construction of Khushab-IV started in 2011. In January 2015 the reactor was believed to be complete and operational.
A further reactor has been speculated on (Khushab-V). Space-based surveillance has not turned up signs that work has begun yet on any fifth plutonium reactor at Khushab, although construction of major facilities continues.

Heavy water production
The heavy water plant is estimated to be able to produce between 50 and 100 tons of heavy water per year.

See also 

 Munir Ahmad Khan
 Khushab
 Jauharabad

References

External links 
 Pakistan Plutonium Production Reactor at Khushab Nuclear Site
 Pakistans Nuclear Ambitions
 Khushab Complex

Nuclear power stations in Pakistan
Nuclear weapons programme of Pakistan
Nuclear reprocessing sites
Nuclear power stations with reactors under construction
Pakistan Atomic Energy Commission
Defence industry of Pakistan